Sykia is a village on the Chalkidiki peninsula in Macedonia, Greece. It is a traditional village in the Sithonia peninsula and has been inhabited since the Byzantine period. Modern Greek singers Sokratis Malamas and Paola Foka both grew up in Sykia.

References

External links

Populated places in Chalkidiki